Jon Jaylo (born July 1975) is a Filipino surrealist painter, now based in New York City, USA.

Early life
Jon Jaylo was born in Manila, Philippines in 1975. His family moved to Chicago, Illinois to finish his grade school, but he returned to the Philippines after graduating, to study Advertising at Far Eastern University.

Career
Jaylo began creating art when he was four years old. He cites among his artistic influences René Magritte, Paul Delvaux, Gustav Klimt, Frida Kahlo, Salvador Dalí and William Bouguereau.

Exhibitions
 Kaboo Del Mar Music Festival & Art Fair, Distinction Gallery, San Diego, California,  September 2018
 If Our Days Won't Last, Group show curated by Jon Jaylo, Distinction Gallery, Escondido, California, 11 November - 2 December 2017
 If Our Own Words Fail, Group show curated by Jon Jaylo, BeinArt Gallery, Brunswick, Australia, 12 March - 2 April 2017
 To End An Echo, Solo Show, BeinArt Gallery, Brunswick, Australia, 12 March - 2 April 2017
 The Eleventh Annual Blab, Group Show, Copro Gallery, Santa Monica, California, 10 September - 1 October 2016
 All These Answers That May Never Come Our Way, Solo Show, Distinction Gallery, California Center for the Arts Escondido, California, 23 September - 13 November 2016
 Small Works 2016, Group Show, BeinArt Gallery, Brunswick, Australia, 17 September - 9 October 2016
 Beinart Surreal Art Show 2016, Group Show, Copro Gallery, Santa Monica, California, 20 February - 12 March 2016
 LA Art Show 2016, Group Show, Distinction Gallery, LA Art Show 2016 Modern Contemporary, California, USA, 27–31 January 2016
 As The Moon Draws Water, Solo Show, Distinction Gallery, Escondido, California, 12 September - 3 October 2015
 Nightmare In Wonderland Project Part II, Group Show, ArtHatch and Distinction Gallery, Escondido, California, USA, 11 April - 2 May 2015
 MI ART 2015, Primo Marella Gallery, Group Show, Milan, Italy, 10–12 April 2015 
 Daydreams, Books & Oddities, Solo Show, J Studio, Taguig, Philippines, 31 January 2015
 Scope Miami Beach 2014 International Contemporary Art Show, Group Show, Florida, USA, 2–7 December 2014
 Chrysalis, Solo Show, West Gallery, Ayala Museum, Makati, The Philippines, 23 August - 3 September 2014
 Distinction's 10th Year Anniversary, Group Show, ArtHatch and Distinction Gallery, Escondido, California, USA, 11 June - 3 July 2014
 Enigma, Solo Show, Primae Noctis Art Gallery, Lugano, Switzerland, 8 May 2014
 Mad Hatters, Group Show, Flower Pepper Gallery, Group Show, Pasadena, California, November 2013
 Here Be Dragons, Artworks, Canvas & West Gallery, Ayala Museum, Makati, The Philippines, September 2013
 Cabinet of Curiosities, Solo Show, Ernst & Youngs S1 Raffles Quay, North Tower, Singapore, 29 November 2013 - 28 February 2014
 Vanishing Folklore, Solo Show, Strychnin Gallery, Berlin, Germany, August 2012
 Duo, Solo Show, West Gallery & Ayala Museum, ArtistSpace, second floor, Glass Lane, Ayala Museum, Makati Ave. cor. Dela Rosa St., Greenbelt Park, Makati, Philippines, 1–14 August 2012
 Reverie & Odyssey, Solo Show, Artesan Gallery, Singapore, April 2012
 Painted Sound, Group Show, Flower Pepper Gallery, Pasadena, California, January 2012
 Art Fair - Blooom, Group Show, Strychnin Gallery, Staatenhaus am Rheinpark, Cologne, Germany, October 2011
 Mirage, Solo Show, West Gallery & Ayala Museum, Greenbelt Park, Makati, Philippines, July 2011
 Dystopia, Group Show, Copro Gallery, Santa Monica, California, USA, 19 March 2011
 The Pillars of the Earth: A Tribute to the Masters, Group Show, Distinction Gallery, Escondido, California, 12 March 2011
 The Mad Potters Tea Party, Group Show, Strychnin Gallery, Berlin, Germany, 4 February 2011
 To Unmask an Enigma, Solo Show, Strychnin Gallery, Berlin, Germany, 8 October 2010
 Art Fair 21 Strychnin Bloom, Group Show, Strychnin Gallery, Cologne, Germany, October 2010
 Metamorphosis, Group Show, Copro Gallery, Santa Monica, California, 5 June 2010
 Theatre of Reveries, Solo Show, West Gallery, Quezon City, Philippines, 22 June 2010
 Canvas, Group Show, Everyday Filipino Heroes, Vargas Museum, Quezon City, Philippines, 1 May 2010
 7 Year Itch, Group Show, Strychnin Gallery, Berlin, Germany, 12 February 2010
 Art 2 Heart, Group Show, Teehankee Foundation, 4/F, Ateneo Schools, Rockwell, Makati, Philippines, 19 December 2009
 Chaos & Harmony, Unit 2C - 05 2F Shops At Serendra, Fort Bonifacio Global City, Philippines, 9 Dec 2009
 Art For Youth's Sake, Southwing Lobby House of Representatives, Quezon City, Philippines, 16 November 2009
 Magistrates, Strychnin Gallery, Berlin, Germany, 13 November 2009
 Tabi Tabi Po, Group Show, 1AM Gallery, San Francisco, California, 13 November 2009
 Illusional Disfunction, Boston Gallery, Cubao, Quezon City, Philippines, 8 August 2009
 Iskwalado, Galerie Anna, SM Megamall, Philippines, 24 July 2009
 Idle Minds, West Gallery, Quezon City, Philippines, 10 July 2009
 Kunstart '09, 6th Intl. Art Fair of Bolzano, Bozen, Italy, 21 May 2009
 Seeing You, Seeing Me, Manila Contemporary White Space, Pasong Tamo Extension, The Philippines, 16 May 2009
 Berlin Show, Strychnin Gallery, Boxhagenerstrasse, Berlin, Germany, 6 February 2009
 Twelve By Nine, West Gallery, SM Megamall, The Philippines, 8 Jan 2009
 Uiwang International Placard Art Festival, Samdong Uiwang City, Kyunggido, South Korea, 3 Oct 2008
 Beyond Borders III, ArtSpace Royal Plaza On Scotts, Singapore, 2 October 2008 
 ART 40, Pinto Art Gallery, Rizal, The Philippines, 20 July 2008
 Unexamined Failure, West Gallery, Quezon City, The Philippines, 17 June 2008
 Beautiful Sins, ARTASIA Gallery, The Philippines, 23 April 2008
 Rekindle, Blanc Gallery, Makati, The Philippines, 7 April 2008
 Florante At Laura, U.P. Vargas Museum, Quezon City, The Philippines, 8 February 2008
 December Show, Blanc Gallery, Makati, The Philippines, 4 Dec 2007
 Peculiar People, Tintero Gallery, Quezon City, The Philippines, 30 Oct 2007
 Boxed, Cultural Center of the Philippines, The Philippines, 26 April 2007

References

Filipino painters
1975 births
Living people
People from Manila
Artists from Metro Manila
Far Eastern University alumni